Mike Madill (born May 9, 1982) is a Canadian former professional ice hockey defenceman. He was formerly General Manager and Head Coach of the last professional team he played with, the Las Vegas Wranglers of the ECHL.

Madill attended St. Lawrence University where he played NCAA Division I hockey with the St. Lawrence Saints men's ice hockey team.

Madill spent the 2010–11 season playing in Japan with the Nippon Paper Cranes. On July 26, 2011, the Las Vegas Wranglers announced that Madill had re-signed with their ECHL team for the 2011–12 season.

Awards and honors

References

External links

1982 births
Living people
Canadian ice hockey defencemen
Houston Aeros (1994–2013) players
Las Vegas Wranglers players
Milwaukee Admirals players
Nippon Paper Cranes players
Quad City Flames players
St. Lawrence Saints men's ice hockey players
Texas Wildcatters players